The 1989–90 Welsh Alliance League is the 6th season of the Welsh Alliance League, which is in the third level of the Welsh football pyramid.

League table

References

External links
Welsh Alliance League

Welsh Alliance League seasons
3
Wales